Benitoite is a rare blue barium titanium cyclosilicate, found in hydrothermally altered serpentinite. It forms in low temperature, high pressure environments typical of subduction zones at convergent plate boundaries. Benitoite fluoresces under short wave ultraviolet light, appearing bright blue to bluish white in color. The more rarely seen clear to white benitoite crystals fluoresce red under long-wave UV light.

It was discovered in 1907 by prospector James M. Couch in the San Benito Mountains roughly halfway between San Francisco and Los Angeles. Due to its similar color, Couch originally believed it to be sapphire, a variety of corundum. In 1909, a sample was sent to the University of California, Berkeley, where mineralogist Dr. George D. Louderback realized it was a previously unknown mineral. Corundum (sapphire) has a defined Mohs hardness of 9, while benitoite is much softer. He named it benitoite for its occurrence near the headwaters of the San Benito River in San Benito County, California.

Benitoite occurs in a number of isolated locations globally, but gemstone quality material has only been found in California at the Benito Gem Mine where it was first discovered. It has been correctly identified in Montana, Arkansas, Japan, and Australia although they formed under slightly different conditions and only grow large enough to be considered an accessory mineral. In 1985 benitoite was named as the official state gem of California.

Non-gem crystals of benitoite can have a very rare, six-pointed twinned form.

Associated minerals and locations

Benitoite typically occurs with an unusual set of minerals, along with minerals that make up its host rock. Frequently associated minerals include:  natrolite, neptunite, joaquinite, serpentine and albite.

Benitoite is a rare mineral found in very few locations including San Benito County, California, Japan and Arkansas. In the San Benito occurrence, it is found in natrolite veins within glaucophane schist within a serpentinite body. In Japan, the mineral occurs in a magnesio-riebeckite-quartz-phlogopite-albite dike cutting a serpentinite body.

References

Cyclosilicates
Gemstones
Titanium minerals
Hexagonal minerals
Minerals in space group 188
Barium minerals
Luminescent minerals
Geology of San Benito County, California
Geology of California
Symbols of California